Chang'an Ford 2016 Chinese FA Super Cup (Chinese: 长安福特2016中国足球协会超级杯) was the 14th Chinese FA Super Cup. The match was played at Chongqing Olympic Sports Center on 27 February 2016, contested by Super League winners Guangzhou Evergrande Taobao and FA Cup winners Jiangsu Suning. Guangzhou Evergrande beat Jiangsu Suning 2–0, thus winning their second Chinese FA Super Cup title after losing in recent three years.

Match

Details

References

External links
 

FA Super Cup
2016
Guangzhou F.C. matches
Jiangsu F.C. matches